Ernst Franz (8 May 1894 – 9 February 1915) was a German Bohemian racing cyclist. He won the German National Road Race in 1913. He was killed during World War I.

References

External links
 

1894 births
1915 deaths
German male cyclists
German cycling road race champions
German military personnel killed in World War I
Sportspeople from Karlovy Vary
German Bohemian people
20th-century German people